Alison Spitzer (born 1990) is an American writer.

Early life and family
Alison Spitzer comes from a family with a background in the automobile industry. Initially, she wanted to work in international relations, so she studied at the American University, and graduated with a master's degree in international communications.

Spitzer married Jeremy Swartz in 2008, and the couple have three children.

Career
Spitzer started her career in New York City at Cassidy & Associates. Later, in 2007, she joined Spitzer Auto in Florida. During the subsequent several years, she shifted the focus of the company's activities to be centered on the internet and increased the company's presence in e-commerce. She set up the company's e-commerce department and launched a number of websites to support it, including one for each franchise.

Spitzer is also the co-author of a book named Grand Theft Auto.

An advocate for the interests of the auto sector, Spitzer is well known for her activism. After the bankruptcies of General Motors and Chrysler, Spitzer pushed for legislation to help dealerships that had to close as a result of the automakers' bankruptcies.

Spitzer is the current president of Spitzer Management.

Awards
 Women's Automotive Association International Award (2014)

Bibliography
 Spitzer, Alison; Alison Spitzer (2011). Grand Theft Auto

References

Further reading
 Diaz-Kope, Luisa M., et al. "A shift in federal policy regulation of the automobile industry: policy brokers and the ACF." Politics and Policy, vol. 41, no. 4, Aug. 2013, pp. 563+. Gale Academic OneFile

1990 births
American manufacturing businesspeople
American University alumni
Living people